The White-Haired Girl is a Chinese opera, ballet, (later adapted to Beijing Opera and a film) by Yan Jinxuan to a Chinese libretto by He Jingzhi and Ding Yi. The folklore of the white-haired girl is believed to have spread widely in the areas occupied by the Communist Party of Northern China since the late 1930s. 
Many years later, a literary work was created in the liberated area controlled by the Chinese Communist Party in the late 1940s. The film was made in 1950 and the first Peking opera performance was in 1958.  The first ballet performance was by Shanghai Dance Academy, Shanghai in 1965. It has also been performed by the noted soprano Guo Lanying.

The opera is based on legends circulating in the border region of Shanxi, Chahar and Hebei, describing the misery suffered by local peasantry, particularly the misery of the female members.  The stories are based on real-life stories of no fewer than half a dozen women, in a time frame stretching from the late Qing dynasty to the 1920s or 1930s.  The political overtone and historical background when it was created means that communist propaganda was added in inevitably, and the most obvious example was the added portion of happy ending and the protagonists joining the communist force, which did not happen in real life.

Along with Red Detachment of Women, the ballet is regarded as one of the classics of revolutionary China, and its music is familiar to almost everyone who grew up during the 1960s. It is one of the Eight Model Operas approved by Jiang Qing during the Cultural Revolution.The White-Haired Girl also intentionally showed the political meaning by creating a figure of diligent and beautiful country woman who was under the oppression of the evil landowner. As it aroused an emotion against the "old ruling class", it satisfied "moral ideas of the left-wing literary and artistic intelligence, the popular social and cultural values of rural and urban audiences". The film presented "the traditional Chinese agricultural lifecycle", where the poor lived in poverty no matter how hard they tried. It implied a revolution to overthrown the unchanging social structure. As the mise-en-scene of the film, it used a fair amount of medium-shot to define the character through facial expressions.

Characters and cast 
Yang Xier

The daughter of a tenant farmer Yang Bailao and the fiancée of Wang Dachun. She was forced to sell to the landlord Huang Shiren to repay his father's debt. After suffering humiliation and mistreatment from the landlord and the landlord's mother, Xier eventually escaped and hid in a mountain temple while surviving on offerings. Due to lack of sunlight and little salt intake, her skin and hair gradually turned white causing local villagers to mistakenly perceive her as a powerful white-haired goddess. In the end, Xier was found by Dachun and they reunited.

Performer: Tian Hua (b. 1928, HeBei, China)

Tian Hua is a well-known actress famous for her role of Xier. She received extensive learning from the Central Academy of Drama. She was nominated and received Hundred Flowers Awards, Golden Rooster Awards and Golden Phoenix Awards.

Huang Shiren

The landlord who forced Yang Bailao to sell Xier to repay debts. He abused and humiliated Xier and the other maids. After Xier escaped, he encountered white-haired Xier and recognized her as a reincarnation of a goddess who came to punish him for his mistreatment of Xier. Huang Shiren was eventually punished by the villagers.

Performer: Chen Qiang (1918-2021, HeBei, China)

Chen Qiang was a film and stage actor best known for his performances as antagonists in The Red Detachment of Women, The White Haired Girl and Devils on the Doorstep. His performance in The White Haired Girl gained the Special Recognition Award in 6th Karlovy Vary International Film Festival.

Wang Dachun

A farmer, a neighbor and fiancé of Xier. After Xier was taken away by the landlord, Dachun joined the Communists's Eighth Route Army and fought in the Anti-Japanese War. After his return from the war, he overthrew the landlord and distributed his farmland to peasants. In the end, he found Xier in the mountains and rejoined.

Performer: Li BaiWan (1926-2010)

Li BaiWan joined the Communists's Eighth Route Army at the age of 11.

Plot
(Based on the ballet version)

It is the eve of the Chinese Spring Festival. The peasant girl Xi'er from a village in Yanggezhuang, Hebei province is waiting for her father Yang Bailao to return home to celebrate the Spring Festival together.  Her father, a tenant peasant hired under the despotic and usurious landlord Huang Shiren (who makes a fortune as a loan shark exploiting peasants), has been force to run away from home to avoid the debt collectors.  Xi'er's girl friends come to bring her paper cuttings with which they decorate the windows.  After the girls leave, Xi'er's fiancé, Wang Dachun, comes to give two catties of wheat flour to Xi'er so that she can make jiaozis.  In turn, Xi'er gives Dachun a new sickle as a gift.

Xi'er's father secretly returns home at dusk, with no gift other than a red ribbon to tie to his daughter's hair for the festivity of the holiday.  The landlord catches wind of his return and will not let them have a peaceful and happy Spring Festival, and the debt collector comes for the high rent which Yang has been unable to pay.  They kill Yang Bailao, and take away Xi'er by force as his concubine.  Dachun and other villagers come on the scene, and Dachun wants to go to the landlord's residence to fight for justice but is stopped by Zhao Dashu (Uncle Zhao) who, instead, instruct Dachun and other young people to join the Eighth Route Army.

At the home of the landlord, Xi'er is forced to work day and night as a slave and is exhausted.  Zhang Ershen (literally Second Aunt Zhang), an elderly maid of the landlord, is very sympathetic of Xi'er.  Xi'er dozes off while trying to take a short break. The mother of the landlord comes on the scene and, with her hairpin, pokes Xi'er's face to wake her up. The landlord mother then orders Xi'er to prepare her a lotus seed soup.  When the soup is served, the landlord mother, displeased with the taste, pours the still-boiling soup on Xi'er's face. Outraged by the pain and anger, Xi'er picks up the whip that the landlord uses to punish her, and beats up the landlord mother.  The landlord mother falls and crawls on the floor attempting to flee while Xi'er continues to whip her with her utmost strength.  Xi'er gets her vengeance, but she is subsequently locked up by the landlord.

One day, the landlord leaves his overcoat in the living room and in the pocket of the overcoat is the key to Xi'er's cell.  Zhang Ershen is determined to help Xi'er.  She takes the key and opens the door for Xi'er, who flees.  Shortly, the landlord finds Xi'er missing, and sends his accomplice, Mu Renzhi, and other men to chase her.  Xi'er comes to a river that stops her.  She takes off a shoe and leaves it at the river side, and then hides in the bush. Mu Renzhi and his men find the shoe and assume that Xi'er has drowned herself in the river, and they report to the landlord as such.

Xi'er escapes to the mountains, and in the following years, she lives in a cave, gathers offerings for food from a nearby temple.  She fights attacking wolves and other beasts.  In time, her hair turns white from suffering the elements.

On one stormy night, the landlord Huang Shiren and several of his other servants come to the temple to worship and provide offerings. Their trip is stopped by the thunderstorm.  Coincidentally Xi'er is now in the temple too, and by the light of a flash of lightning, the landlord sees her — with her long white hair and shabby clothes that have been weathered to nearly white.  He thinks it is the reincarnation of a goddess who has come to punish him for his mistreatment of Xi'er and other despotisms.  He is so frightened that he is paralyzed with fear. Xi'er recognizes that it is her arch-enemy and seizes the opportunity to take further revenge.  She picks up the brass incense burner and hurls it against the landlord. The landlord and his gang flee.

Meanwhile, her fiancé, Wang Dachun, has joined the Eighth Route Army and fought the Japanese invaders.  Now he returns with his army to overthrow the rule of the imperialist Japanese and the landlord.  They distribute his farmland to the peasants.  Zhang Ershen tells the story of Xi'er, and they decide to look for her in the mountains.  Wang Dachun finally finds her in the cave with her hair turned white.  They reunite and rejoice. The final ending of the film fulfilled the audience's revenge to the "evil landlord". The landlord accepted the punishment from the angry people under the judgment of the CCP.

History and evolution 
In 1944, under the direction of President Zhou Yang, some artists of The Lu Xun Academy of Art in Yan 'an produced an opera, "The White Haired Girl", based on the folk tales and legends of the "white-haired immortal" in 1940.

According to one of its original writers, He Jingzhi, the play "The White-haired girl" is based on a real-life story about a "white-haired goddess" in North Hebei Province in 1940s. The "White-haired goddess" is a peasant woman who lost her family lived in the wild like animals, who was then found by The Eighth Route Army and sent to the village. 
 
To commemorate the Seventh National Congress of the Chinese Communist Party, the opera was first performed in Yan An in 1945, and was highly praised by the leadership of the Communist Party and achieved great success. Later, it was widely performed in the liberated area. The end of 1945 saw the Shanxi-Chahar-Hebei version. In order to meet the needs of " national salvation to prevail over cultural enlightenment", the play has been continuously adapted into different versions.

In July 1947, Ding Yi, another opera co-author, made many changes and deletions to the Shanxi-Chahar-Hebei version, mainly to cut pregnant Xi Er's hard life after escaping to the cave.

In 1950, the opera was further adapted into a new version by He Jingzhi. This revision followed Ding Yi's thought of deletion and modification, and also made major changes to the original play. These changes included some important parts of Xi Er's characters. At the same year, famous Japanese ballet dancer Mikiko Matsuyama and her husband Masao Shimizu came to China. They had watched The White-Haired Girl film and aimed to transfer the story into a ballet version. Five years later in Japan, Matsuyama played Xi’er in the ballet.

In 1958, Mikiko Matsuyama and her ballet troupe performed the ballet version of The White-Haired Girl. This was the first time that The White-Haired Girl has performed in a ballet.

Chinese ballet troupe performed the show in 1964. However, in the rehearsal stage, in order to better interpret the peasants, all ballet dancers lived with farmers in a small village to experience their lives.

In 2015, Ministry of Culture of the People's Republic of China followed Xi's speech, which was about the literature and arts in China, and launched a revival tour of The White-Haired Girl. Under Peng Liyuan's artistic direction, the performance began in Yan’an. The tour incorporated 3D visual effects and ended in Beijing in Mid-December 2015.

Related historical events 
Politics:

In 1942, In Yan'an, Shanxi, Mao Zedong published a speech at the Yan 'an Forum on Literature and Art, in which he proposed that literature and art should be combined with the masses of workers, peasants and soldiers, rather than transcend classes. At the same time, the Communist Party comrades in Yan'an also launched the mass production movement and the rectification movement, which made the literary and art workers in Yan'an realize that they should create a new artistic work in their productive labor and reflect the ideology of the Chinese Communist Party. "The White-Haired Girl" is initially a widespread folktale, in order to implement the spirit of the Forum on Literature and Art promulgated by Mao Zedong in Yan'an and also prepare a show for the upcoming Seventh National Congress of the Chinese Communist Party, people process and adapt "The White-Haired Girl" into a national opera.

Economics:

At that time, during the war of resistance against Japanese aggression, due to the economic closure and military encirclement of the anti-Japanese base areas, coupled with the severe natural disasters that the base areas suffered for several years in a row, the revolutionary base areas faced severe economic difficulties. People's lives are very difficult, especially the farmers. At that time, the War of Resistance Against Japanese Aggression had not yet been completely won, and the peasant masses were still subjected to oppression, arbitrary bullying and cruel economic exploitation by the landlord class. Therefore, after the victory of the War of Resistance against Japanese Aggression, confiscating land from the landlord class to the working masses and solving the land problem became the primary demand of the broad masses. The White-Haired Girl was written during this period. Between the lines of the script, it reflected the common people's desire to turn over, to liberate and to create a new society. On the side, it reflected the cruelty of the landlord class and the people's eager expectation for the new society and the Communist Party to become strong and prosperous.

Culture:

In terms of culture, it puts forward the concept of "improvement of people's entertainment", vigorously carries out cultural entertainment activities to guide people's mood to develop in the direction of health and pleasure, puts forward the significance of culture to people's life and the role of entertainment to people's physical and mental transformation, and pays more attention to farmers' ideas and views on new life. In the old days, the masses were more connected with culture and entertainment when there was less farming. In Yan 'an, the Yangge dance has received much attention. The Yangge dance has removed its previous low taste and now develops towards a healthy and pleasant direction, reflecting the new relationship between people and the Yangge dance. The development of Yangge dance laid a good foundation for The White-Haired Girl, and finally performed the opera The White-Haired Girl with national characteristics.

Ballet 
The White-Haired Girl is the first opera ballet in China，It is divided into nine chapters, include the prologue and chapter1 to chapter8. According to the form of performance The White-Haired Girl is classified as "Opera Ballet". It is characterized by Ballet in opera, important to the outstanding performance of plot and character characteristics.The movement atmospheric and resolute. For this performance The White-Haired Girl more inclined to the Russian style. By the way, There are many traditional ballet movements in opera like the Battement tendu, Grand battement jete and priouette.etc.

Connections to and differences from the film version 
Featuring the same basic plot and background from the opera and ballet, the film is adapted from the opera of the same title. It tells the story of Xier's escape into the mountains and forests after being raped by the landlord Huang Shiren. Her hair turns white, and she is rescued by Dachun later.

The biggest difference between the film and opera is form of expression. The movie abandoned some dance moves and songs, but it is more direct to show the story and theme, That make it easier for people to understand the theme, Through the tragic experiences of Yang Bailao and Xi'er's, father and daughter, this paper deeply reveals the sharp contradiction between the landlords and the peasants, angrily accuses the evils of the landlord class, warmly praises the Communist Party and the new society, vividly illustrates the theme of "the old society forces people into ghosts, and the new society turns ghosts into people", and points out the only way for the peasants to turn over and liberate.

The opera ballet more emphasize to Performance tension than the film, It is obvious that Opera Ballet are more ornamental, and test the actors skills.

Values of the opera 
Perceived value:

The opera "The White-Haired Girl", for the toiling masses at that time, they could understand the position and responsibility of the Communists in the play; For the landlords of the time, they can see clearly in the play the great revolutionary situation in the country and realize their precarious situation; For us now, we can not only further understand the history of the Party, but also directly see the "suffering of the people" during the revolutionary war.

Moral value:

Yang Bailao, a tenant who symbolizes "kindness, duty and diligence", would rather hurt himself than plot revenge against Huang Shiren and Mu Renzhi, his housekeeper, even if he was bullied.Xi 'er, the protagonist, even though she was humiliated in every way and hated Huang Shiren to the core, she never waited for an opportunity to kill him or hurt the innocent.

Even at the dawn of liberation, she did not put forward any additional demands for revenge at the villagers' meeting...In general, the play uses the ugly faces of Huang Shiren and his butler Mu Renzhi to highlight the kindness and misery of the main characters Xi 'er and Yang Bailao, thus showing its moral value.

Aesthetic value:

Opera "white-haired girl" centrally the darkness of the old society, but it skillfully use contrast, the most revolutionary theme "old force people to become" ghost "and the new society" ghost "into" runs through the whole, the new China (liberated areas) were described in this light, fueled and who have a common destiny toiling masses to "smash the feudal shackles, the hope of real liberation.

Influence 
In 1951, the film The White Haired Girl had its first screening in mainland China. The number of audience reached 6 million on its first show.  According to statistics done by Popular Cinema, the film The White Haired Girl ranked first in the most popular film ranking list in 1959. Total audience in 1950s in mainland China was about 150 million. It can be said that almost everyone at that time in China had watched the film The White Haired Girl.

Apart from mainland China, The White Haired Girl also received great reputation in other parts of the world. Even though most capitalist countries were not showing the film due to ideology differences, over 30 countries and regions had publicly shown The White Haired Girl in the 1950s. The film itself won the Special Honorary Prize out of all 38 Prizes at the Sixth Karlovy Cary International Film Festival in 1951 in Czech Republic. French film historian Georges Sadoul also praised The White Haired Girl in his The History of Film Art.

The White Haired Girl was the first film that caused national sensation in China. As a film that adapted from a famous Chinese opera, it quickly spread across the country in the form of film and received a great number of praise for its plot and new adaptation. It has a pivotal position in the early film production in mainland China.

Differences among adaptations
The original hybrid, western-style geju opera was created by collaboration of composer Ma Ke and others in Yan'an's Lu Xun Art Academy in 1945. It differs from later adaptations in its depiction of superstition.  In the original opera of 1945, Xi'er was caught by the local population, who believed she was a ghost and had power to inflict harm on people.  To try to destroy her evil magical power, the local populace poured the boys' urine, the blood of a slain black dog, menstrual blood, and human and animal feces on her, something that was done in real life to at least one of the girls. Her suffering as a woman in a patriarchal society gradually became the suffering of the exploited and oppressed social class. Communists felt it was necessary to eradicate the superstition that was still deeply rooted in the minds of local populaces, so this barbaric act was accurately reflected in the opera, with Wang Dachun eventually stopping the mob after recognizing Xi'er, leading to the final happy ending.  After the communist victory in China, this scene was deleted in later adaptations for fear of encouraging superstition and presenting a negative image of the working-class people.

In the 1950 film version, Xi'er's father was tricked and driven to suicide by Huang Shiren.  Xi'er was raped by Huang Shiren and became pregnant.  When Huang Shiren got married, he and his mother decided to sell Xi'er to a brothel. With Auntie Yang's help,  Xi'er ran away to the mountains and gave birth to a still-born baby. The suffering of Xi'er reflected the contradiction between the poor peasants and the landlord class in the semi-colonial and semi-feudal society, which proved that only the people's revolution led by the Communist Party could remove the feudalism and free the peasants who had the same fate as Xi'er.

Music
"White-haired Girl" is a new national opera that combines poetry, song and dance.
First, the structure of the opera plot, the division of the traditional Chinese opera, the scene changes, diverse and flexible.
Secondly, the language of opera inherits the fine tradition of singing and singing in Chinese opera.
Third, opera music uses northern folk songs and traditional opera music as materials and creates them. It also absorbs some expressions of Western opera music and has a unique national flavor.
Fourth, opera performance, learning the traditional Chinese opera performance methods, paying due attention to dance figure and chanting rhythm, at the same time, also learning how to read the lines of the drama, both beautiful and natural, close to life.
This play uses the tunes of northern folk music, absorbs drama music, and draws on the creation experience of Western European opera.
Unlike other ballets, the music of The White-Haired Girl is more like that of a musical, i.e., it blends a large number of vocal passages, both solos on the part of Xi'er and choruses into the music. Because of their mellifluous melodies, these songs became very popular. The following is a partial list of these songs:

"Looking at the World"
"The Blowing North Wind"
"Tying the Red Ribbon"
"Suddenly the Day Turns to Night"
"Join the Eighth Route Army"
"Longing for the Rising Red Sun in the East"
"Big Red Dates for the Beloved"
"The Sun Is Out"
"Dear Chairman Mao"

Track listing

References

External links

 
 
 YouTube: Xi'er's Solo in Act I
 YouTube: The White-Haired Girl (1971, full movie of ballet version)

Citation
Bai, Di. "Feminism in the Revolutionary Model Ballets The White-Haired Girl and The Red Detachment of Women." Art in Turmoil: The Chinese Cultural Revolution 76 (1966): 188–202.

Bohnenkamp, Max L. Turning Ghosts into People: "The White-Haired Girl", Revolutionary Folklorism and the Politics of Aesthetics in Modern China, ProQuest Dissertations Publishing, 2014.

Jia, Bo. Gender, Women's Liberation, And The Nation-State: A Study of The Chinese Opera The White Haired Girl. New Brunswick, New Jersey. May, 2015.

Ll Jing, The Retrospect and Reflection of the New Yangge Movement's Research[J],Journal of Qinghai Normal University(Philosophy and Social Sciences Edition).Journal of Qinghai Normal University,Xining 810008,China. March, 2009.

Shan Yuan, Analysis of the Implied Connotation of the Text: White Hair Girl[J],Research of Chinese Literature, Xianning Teachers College, Xianning city, Hubei 437005,China. March,2002

Wilkinson, J. Norman. "‘The White-Haired Girl’: From ‘Yangko’ to Revolutionary Modern Ballet." Educational Theatre Journal, vol. 26, no. 2, 1974, pp. 164–74. Crossref, doi:10.2307/3206632.

Wu Hanyue, "An Analysis of the Creation Background of the Opera The White-Haired Girl", Song of Yellow River, China Academic Journal Electronic Publishing House, December 2020, p173.

Yin Jiangyan, " Study on the value of Ideological and Political Education in literary and artistic works ——Red classic opera " the white-haired girl" as the center", Hunan University of Science and Technology, China 
Academic Journal Electronic Publishing House, June 2018.

"Chinese Opera Music Album: The White Haired Girl by Various Artists." Apple Music, China Record Corporation, 31 Dec. 2002, music.apple.com/us/album/chinese-opera-music-album-the-white-haired-girl/111883716.

Wang Bin and Shui Hua, "The White Haired Girl" Changchun Film Studio, 1950

新浪娱乐. "第30届大众电影百花奖获奖名单." 新浪娱乐, 新浪娱乐, 16 Oct. 2010, ent.sina.com.cn/m/c/2010-10-16/11193114573.shtml.

中国电影表演艺术学会 . "第十二届表演艺术学会奖金凤凰奖 - 终身成就奖." 中国电影表演艺术学会, 中国电影表演艺术学会, www.1985byxh.com/awards12_chengjiu.html.

中国电影家协会. "第一届中国电影金鸡奖获奖及提名名单（1981）." 中国电影家协会, 中国电影家协会, www.cfa1949.com/pjbj/jjj/jjljhjmd/.

腾讯娱乐 . 陈佩斯父亲陈强去世 生前主演《白毛女》成名, 腾讯娱乐, 27 June 2012, ent.qq.com/a/20120627/000035.htm.

释凡. "著名表演艺术家陈强生前十大经典角色." 陈强十大经典影视角色, 网易娱乐, ent.163.com/special/chenqiangyingshijuesejingdian/.

1965 ballet premieres
Maoist China propaganda
Chinese western-style operas
Operas
Chinese plays adapted into films
Works about landlords